Big Huggin' is an affective video game developed by Critical Gameplay in 2013. It was created by Lindsay Grace. It has been show in exhibits in United States, Mexico, France, and Brazil.

Gameplay
Its design is based on Critical Design, and in contrast to classic video games, it is not controlled by mouse or keyboard, but rather the controls of the game are based on hugs made to a 30-inch custom teddy bear.

Development

Big Huggin' was created in 2012 by Lindsay Grace, and its promotion continue in different cities and countries.

Kickstarter campaign

Lindsay Grace launched a Kickstarter campaign on January 15, 2013, in order to raise US$2,500 for the continued promotion and exhibition of the game. A subsequent goal was the subsidized release of the game for children in places where giving hugs is even more valuable than usual. The campaign helped fund the production of bears and the game. The campaign was founded on February 14, 2013 and raised US$3,080.

Gameplay

Player input is collected by hugging a 30-inch custom teddy bear rather than a video game controller with buttons.

Reception

See also
 Affection
 Positive affectivity

References 

2011 video games
Critical Gameplay games
Fictional teddy bears
Positive psychology
Single-player video games
Video games about bears
Video games about toys
Video games developed in the United States
Windows games
Windows-only games